Shivalik Fossil Park, also known as the Suketi Fossil Park , is a notified National Geo-heritage Monument
 fossil park in the Sirmaur district in the Indian state of Himachal Pradesh. It has a collection of prehistoric vertebrate fossils and skeletons recovered from the upper and middle Siwaliks geological formations of sandstones and clay at Suketi.  The park has a display of the fossil finds and an open-air exhibition of six life-sized fiberglass models of extinct mammals in a recreation of the Sivalik Hills environment of the Plio-Pleistocene era (circa 2.5 million years). A museum, within the precincts of the park curated and exhibits the fossils. Shivalik is Asia's biggest fossil park. The exhibits in the park are used to generate scientific interest among the public, and facilitate special international studies by visiting research scholars from all over the world.

Location
The park is named after the Suketi village where it is located, at the site where the fossils were found, in the Markanda River valley, at the foot of the Himalayas. It is {{Convheadquarters of Sirmaur district. A tourism information desk is maintained at the park.

It is 70 km from Chandigarh, 48 km from Yamunanagar, 48 km from Ambala and 250 km from Delhi. There is narrow side lane to reach the park. Preferable use small vehicle to reach there.

History
The idea to establish a museum was mooted to preserve the fossil site and the fossils from being indiscriminately extracted and vandalized. It was also intended to provide prehistoric period scientific information for scholarly research. The Geological Survey of India, in association with the Government of Himachal Pradesh, established the park on 23 March 1974. The park is also maintained by the Geological Survey of India.

The  Geological Survey of India identifies the fossils as vertebrates that lived in the area about 2.5 million years ago,. Scientists believe that the Shivalik Hills, which formed about twenty-five million years ago, show the evolution of mankind. The mammalian fossils found in the Shiwaliks of this park are one of the world's richest antiquities.

Features

The fiberglass models on display in an open area, outside the museum are of six extinct animals. They are: Huge land tortoise, gharial, four–horned giraffe, sabre-toothed cat, large tusked elephant, and hippopotamus.

The Saketi Park has a unique feature, in a miniature form, of the prehistoric biological record of the Upper Siwalik rocks, similar to those found in the Patwar Plateau and adjacent hills, also in Mangla dam areas in the region.

Models
A model depicts a sabre-tooth cat with very long upper canine teeth to tear its prey. This animal became extinct about a million years ago, at the same time that many species of elephants became extinct. The hippopotamus model, life-size and similar to its modern counterpart, has six incisors with a comparatively larger mouth, but with a small brain cavity, longer lower jaw, and legs like a pig. This species, which existed in large numbers about 2.5 million years ago, is now extinct. The model of the giant land tortoise, representing a species found in the Shivalik region, is the largest of all tortoises, but its modern counterpart is much smaller. 
Other models depict giant elephants that roamed the area 7 to 1.5 million years ago. Compared to modern elephants, they had a smaller cranium, unusually long tusks, and huge limbs. 15 of these species vanished about 1.5 million years ago. A model of a four-horned giraffe depicts an ancestor of the modern species that lived in the region 7 to 1.5 million years ago. It has an unusually large skull, but comparatively short neck. 
The models were initially within the park. However a fire in the jungle damaged a few of the models, and now the remaining ones are just outside the museum.

Museum
Museum exhibits contain skeletal remains of different groups of skulls and limbs of mammals, skulls of Hexaprotodon, tortoises, gharials and crocodiles, tusks of 22 species of elephants, rocks and charts and paintings related to the several aspects of plant and animal life of the past and present. The stone items on display belong to the Early Palaeolithic Man. Also preserved in the museum are fossils of two genera of extinct primates,  Sivapithecus and Ramapithecus. The museum also houses antiquities unearthed by Captain Cautley in the area, from which he dug out the remains of Asia's oldest human ancestor.

Exhibits also include an Indian postage stamp with images of two elephants and tusks, issued in 1951 on the occasion of the centenary of the Geological Survey of India.

See also
 Kalesar National Park, next to the fossil park on eastern side
 Khol Hi-Raitan Wildlife Sanctuary, next to the fossil park on western side
 Morni Hills, next to the fossil park on western side
 Mandla Plant Fossils National Park
 National Fossil Wood Park, Tiruvakkarai
 Ghughua Fossil Park

References

External links
 Google map of the Saketi Fossil Park

Bibliography

National Geological Monuments in India
Buildings and structures in Sirmaur district
Protected areas of Himachal Pradesh
Museums in Himachal Pradesh
Fossil parks in India
1974 in paleontology
Cenozoic paleontological sites
1974 establishments in Himachal Pradesh
Protected areas established in 1974